Kurepõllu (Estonian for "Crane Field") is a subdistrict in the district of Lasnamäe, Tallinn, the capital of Estonia. It has a population of 3,800.

See also
FC Ajax Lasnamäe

Gallery

References

Subdistricts of Tallinn